Korea National Oil Corporation (KNOC) is the national oil and gas company of South Korea and one of the most important industrial companies in the country. The company has operated and continues to operate oil and gas fields in Vietnam, Peru, Indonesia, Nigeria, Yemen, Kazakhstan, Russia, Canada, Venezuela and South Korea.

On 26 September 2008 KNOC signed a deal with the Kurdistan Regional Government where KNOC was granted rights to explore and drill on several sites in the Iraqi Kurdistan in exchange for valuable support on a range of infrastructure projects.

In 2009, the company purchased Harvest Operations for US$1.7 billion, along with its subsidiary North Atlantic Refining and its refinery in Come By Chance, Newfoundland and Labrador. It also assumed Harvest's US$2.2 billion in outstanding debt. The US$3.9 billion bid was one of KNOC's largest deals at the time. That same year, the company acquired a 50% stake in privately held Petro-Tech, an oil firm with offshore assets in Peru.

On 2 July 2010 KNOC confirmed preliminary discussions regarding a US$2.9 billion offer for the entire issued and to-be-issued share capital of Aberdeen-based Dana Petroleum. In September 2010, Dana's management had continued to reject the takeover approach, but 64% of shares had already been bought by KNOC. The takeover was official in October 2010, when KNOC secured 90% of Dana Petroleum's shares by going straight to the shareholders. The action led to the resignment of the chairman and three non-executive directors from the board.

Notes

External links
 
Petronet
Opinet

Oil companies of South Korea
Natural gas companies of South Korea
National oil and gas companies
Energy companies established in 1979
Non-renewable resource companies established in 1979